Ezio Cardi (born 24 October 1948) is an Italian retired track cyclist. As an amateur he competed in the sprint and 1000 m time trial events at the 1972 Summer Olympics, placing ninth in the time trial. In 1973 he turned professional and won a bronze medal in the sprint at the 1973 UCI Track Cycling World Championships.

References

External links
 

1948 births
Living people
Italian male cyclists
Olympic cyclists of Italy
Cyclists at the 1972 Summer Olympics
Cyclists from the Province of Verona